Chris Cord  (July 15, 1940 - July 28, 2022) was a race car driver and was a grandson of Errett Lobban Cord, the founder of the Cord Corporation which also ran Cord Automobile.

In 1987, he won the IMSA Camel GT  Driver's Championship.

IROC Involvement
Chris Cord was invited to the International Race of Champions in 1988. During this time his best finish was sixth place, at Watkins Glen International.

External links
Chris Cord at racing-reference.info

1940 births
American racing drivers
International Race of Champions drivers
Living people
IMSA GT Championship drivers
24 Hours of Le Mans drivers
Racing drivers from California
Racing drivers from Los Angeles
Sportspeople from Los Angeles